Ponte Nossa is a comune (municipality) in the Province of Bergamo in the Italian region of Lombardy, located about  northeast of Milan and about  northeast of Bergamo.

Ponte Nossa borders the following municipalities: Casnigo, Clusone, Gandino, Gorno, Parre, Premolo.

Demographic evolution

Twin towns — sister cities
Ponte Nossa is twinned with:

  Teresina, Brazil (2011)

References